Power Politics is a book of poetry by Canadian author Margaret Atwood, published in 1971.

It contains her famous simile:

The violent surprise of this poem is typical of Atwood’s imagery.

Gender is a crucial theme in Power Politics. The collection was often dismissed as a poetic version of Women's Lib although Atwood herself rejected the notion that the Women's Movement influenced the conception of Power Politics.

Notes

External links

1971 poetry books
Poetry by Margaret Atwood
Canadian poetry collections
House of Anansi Press books